Stuart Ian McGrady (8 April 1985 – 1 March 2015) was a Scottish professional footballer who played as a forward for Ayr United, Cumnock Juniors, Queen's Park and Maybole.

References

1985 births
2015 deaths
Scottish footballers
Association football forwards
Scottish Football League players
Ayr United F.C. players
Cumnock Juniors F.C. players
Queen's Park F.C. players
Maybole F.C. players